Blink is a British production company and creative studio producing commercials, music videos, short films, branded content, and long-form entertainment. It is composed of Blink Productions, Blink ink, Blink Art, and Blink Industries. The company's head offices are based in Soho, London. Blink is headed by managing director, James Studholme, and represents a total of 48 directors and artists across its five divisions.

Blink was named "Production Company of the Year" by Campaign in 2012 for the second consecutive year, having previously held the title in 2011 and 1997. Blink was also chosen in 2011, 2014 and 2015 for the same accolade by Televisual Magazine. In both 2013 and 2015, Blink was named Production Company of The Year at the British Arrow Awards, as well as a winning a total of 18 gold and silver awards for its commercials. Blink won the Grand Prix at Cannes Lions 2016 for Harvey Nichols' "Shoplifters", having won the Film Craft Grand Prix in 2015 for John Lewis "Monty's Christmas".

Overview
Blink is known for discovering and developing new creative talent, and in the past has launched the careers of many successful directors. These include Ivan Zacharias, Doug Foster, Dominic Murphy, Kevin Thomas, Trevor Melvin, Dougal Wilson, Steve Reeves and Paul Gay. Blink's current roster of directors is drawn from a diverse range of backgrounds and many work in a variety of disciplines.  James Studholme has said that in creating these subdivisions, Blink is well positioned to reach beyond the realm of traditional advertising and navigate the "uncharted terrain where brands and culture collide". Blink's peers within the advertising industry have credited the company's success to a "clever diversity of a brand giving it greater longevity and taking full advantage of an expanding marketplace".

History

Artist Bob Lawrie founded Blink in London in 1984 as a vehicle for his creative art and directing projects. Initially it was an animation company doing TV program titles, Channel Idents and music promos.  James Studholme joined in 1985 as producer. Blink branched out into live action in 1993 with a Red Stripe commercial for TV and cinema. Studholme bought young directors Mike Bennion and Simon Fellows into the firm. In 2000 Bob Lawrie departed leaving James Studholme at the helm. Since 2004, Blink has launched four specialised sub-divisions in addition to its commercial production company, and currently operates as an all-encompassing creative studio producing commercials, animations, art, music videos and long form content.

In 2005, the firm extended their reach to the United States. James Studholme and Diane McArter (who previously founded Omaha Pictures) launched a new US production company, Furlined, as founding partners. Several of Blink's directors are represented in the USA by Furlined, who have offices in Los Angeles and New York.

One of the firm's most memorable projects is Gorilla, a commercial directed by Juan Cabral for Cadbury. The advert first aired in 2007 and features an actor in a gorilla costume drumming to In the Air Tonight by Phil Collins. In its first week, the commercial was viewed over 500,000 times on YouTube and has received over 6 million views since then. Gorilla was voted ITV's favourite TV advert of 2007 and 5th best advert of the decade in an online poll by tellyads.com. It has also won numerous top advertising industry awards, such as the Film Grand Prix Lion at the Cannes Lions 2008, Gold at the British Television Advertising Awards (British Arrows) 2008 and Black and Yellow Pencils at the D&AD Awards 2008.

Blink

Blink has been the production company's advertising-focused division since the firm was founded. In January 2018 it joined forces with Colonel Blimp (previously the music video production arm of the company) to consolidate their  rosters. Blink has produced commercials for Guinness, Cadbury's, Yorkie, Nokia, Pot Noodle, Ikea, John Lewis, Channel 4 'Superhumans', Harvey Nichols and Virgin, and music videos for artists such as Coldplay, The Streets, Björk, U2, Tinie Tempah, and The Maccabees.

In 2010, Blink produced a commercial with agency Adam & Eve for John Lewis. The commercial was directed by Dougal Wilson and shows a woman ageing 70 years in 90 seconds, accompanied by Fyfe Dangerfield's cover of Billy Joel's She's Always A Woman. The advert follows a woman through her life, from her birth through school, marriage, having children and becoming a grandmother.  A week after the advert first aired on television, The Guardian newspaper reported that as a result of the advert's influence, a 39.7% increase in sales on John Lewis' website was reported. To date, the advert has received over 1,000,000 total views on YouTube. The commercial won three Gold awards at the British Arrows in 2011.

In 2011, Dougal Wilson repeated his success for John Lewis and Adam & Eve with The Long Wait, a commercial screened in the run-up to Christmas. The advert tells the story of a young boy counting down to Christmas Day, set to a cover of The Smiths' Please, Please, Please Let Me Get What I Want by Slow Moving Millie. The advert was awarded 3rd place in Creativity Magazine's Best of 2011 TV and it was watched over 4,000,000 times in total on YouTube since it aired in November 2011. Since then Wilson has made several further films for John Lewis most notably, Christmas 2012's "Snowman", Christmas 2014's "Monty's Christmas", and in 2015, "Tiny Dancer". His most recent work includes "Superhumans" for Channel 4's Paralympics Rio 2016. In 2015, music video ''Glore'' by Radkey, produced by Blinkink received a nomination at the Berlin Music Video Awards.

In 2021, Blink was nominated for Best Production Company at the Berlin Music Video Awards. The company has also received nominations for their work on music videos Rag'n'Bone Man - ''All You Ever Wanted'', Moby - ''My Only Love'' (Blink ink), Nothing But Thieves - ''A Real Love Song''.

Colonel Blimp

Colonel Blimp was founded in 2006 as the music video production arm of the firm, and has since merged its roster with Blink. The company was named in homage to Powell and Pressburger's 1943 film The Life and Death of Colonel Blimp. The division once represented a roster of 19 directors and produced music videos with international reach for artists such as Coldplay, The Streets, Björk, U2, Tinie Tempah, Kelly Rowland, Unkle, Professor Green and The Maccabees, incorporating both traditional and experimental filmmaking techniques.

Blink Ink

Blink Ink was founded in 2004 to specialize in animation and mixed-media filmmaking. Today Blink Ink is a collective of directors, producers, artists and technicians who create short-form content with their partners in the advertising, music and entertainment industries.

Blink Art

Blink Art was founded in 2009 as the firm's non-traditional production arm. It represent photographers, illustrators and set designers working across print, animation and film. They produce work for international advertising agencies, record companies, fashion brands and design agencies.

In 2012, Blink Art was commissioned by advertising agency Saatchi & Saatchi to create a monument representing the history of Guinness from 1759 to the present day. The sculpture was designed and directed by Blink Art's David Wilson and consists of a carved wooden plinth and floating light sculpture suggesting the recognisable form of a dark pint of Guinness topped with white foam. A team of carpenters, illustrators, designers and artists spent a month creating the monument, which is on display at the Guinness Storehouse in Dublin, Republic of Ireland.

References

External links
 http://www.blinkprods.com
 http://www.blinkink.co.uk
 http://www.blinkart.co.uk
 http://www.colonelblimp.com

Film production companies of the United Kingdom